= IMakr =

3D printing company

iMakr
- Type: Private
- Industry: Retail; 3D Printing
- Founded: April 2013; 13 years ago
- Founder: Sylvain Preumont
- Headquarters: London
- Number of locations: 4 Stores: New York; London; Paris; Denmark
- Area served: Worldwide
- Key people: Wei Liu (CEO)
- Products: 3D printers; 3D Scanners; 3D Consumables
- Owner: Sylvain Preumont
- Website: www.imakr.com

iMakr operates two of the largest physical locations for 3D printing in both London and New York,

== History ==
Founded in London in 2012.

Following their first store in London, iMakr expanded into the United States, opening their New York based office in 2014. Now located in Brooklyn, the NY office is home to training, demos, and workshops.
